The Trofee Maarten Wynants is a one-day cycle race which takes place in Belgium. The women's race was rated by the UCI as category 1.1 until 2019, while the men's race is a domestic kermesse.

Winners

Men's race

Women's race

References

External links

Men's cycle races
Women's cycle races
Cycle races in Belgium